Marlena Zagoni ( Predescu, born 22 January 1951) is a retired Romanian rower. She won a bronze medal in coxless pair at the 1975 World Championships, placing sixth at the 1976 Olympics. She won two more bronze medals: in coxed four at the 1974 World Championships and in the eight event at the 1980 Olympics. Since 1998 she has coached rowers at CSA Steaua București.

References

1951 births
Living people
Romanian female rowers
Olympic rowers of Romania
Rowers at the 1976 Summer Olympics
Rowers at the 1980 Summer Olympics
Olympic bronze medalists for Romania
Olympic medalists in rowing
Medalists at the 1980 Summer Olympics

World Rowing Championships medalists for Romania